"Save the Last Dance for Me" is a song written by Doc Pomus and Mort Shuman, first recorded in 1960 by American musical group the Drifters with Ben E. King on lead vocals. It has since been covered by several artists, including Dalida, the DeFranco Family, Emmylou Harris, Dolly Parton, and Michael Bublé.

Drifters' version
In a 1990 interview, songwriter Doc Pomus tells the story of the song being recorded by the Drifters and originally designated as the B-side of the record. He credits Dick Clark with turning the record over and realizing "Save the Last Dance" was the stronger song. The Drifters' version of the song, released a few months after Ben E. King left the group, would go on to spend three non-consecutive weeks at No. 1 on the U.S. pop chart, in addition to logging one week atop the U.S. R&B chart. In the United Kingdom, the Drifters' recording reached No. 2 in December 1960. This single was produced by Jerry Leiber and Mike Stoller, two noted American music producers who at the time had an apprentice relationship with a then-unknown Phil Spector. Although he was working with Leiber and Stoller at the time, it is unknown whether Spector assisted with the production of this record; however, many Spector fans have noticed similarities between this record and other music he would eventually produce on his own. Damita Jo had a hit with one of the answer songs of this era called "I'll Save The Last Dance For You".

In the song, the narrator tells his lover she is free to mingle and socialize throughout the evening, but to make sure to save him the dance at the end of the night. During an interview on Elvis Costello's show Spectacle, Lou Reed, who worked with Pomus, said the song was written on the day of Pomus' wedding while the wheelchair-using groom watched his bride dancing with their guests. Pomus had polio and at times used crutches to get around. His wife, Willi Burke, however, was a Broadway actress and dancer. The song gives his perspective of telling his wife to have fun dancing, but reminds her who will be taking her home and "in whose arms you're gonna be."

Musicians on the Drifters' recording were Bucky Pizzarelli, Allen Hanlon (guitar), Lloyd Trotman (bass) and Gary Chester (drums).

Charts

Weekly charts

Year-end charts

Certifications

Dalida version

Garde-moi la dernière danse is the eighth album by European pop star Dalida. The title song of the album, a French cover of the American hit "Save the Last Dance for Me", was released as a single. The background orchestra music was led by French composer and orchestra leader Raymond Lefèvre.

Emmylou Harris version
Emmylou Harris covered the song in a country/bluegrass style in 1979, including it on her Blue Kentucky Girl album. Also released as a single, her version reached the top ten on the U.S. country singles chart in mid-1979.

Dolly Parton version

In 1983, Dolly Parton recorded "Save the Last Dance for Me," releasing it as a single in late November; the song subsequently appeared on Parton's album of 1950s and 60s covers The Great Pretender, released in January 1984. Reaching the top ten on the country singles chart in late February, the single also crossed over, reaching No. 45 on the Billboard Hot 100 in the United States.

Charts

The DeFranco Family version

The DeFranco Family (featuring Tony DeFranco) released "Save the Last Dance for Me" in 1974 as a single and the title track of their 2nd album (20th Century Records); the single peaked at No. 18 on the Billboard Hot 100 and No. 8 on Canada's RPM 100 chart. The B-side of the single is "Because We Both Are Young," written by Tom Bahler and Harry Shannon.

Michael Bublé version

"Save The Last Dance For Me" was later covered by Canadian crooner Michael Bublé, and released as the third and final single from his second studio album, It's Time. The song was heavily remixed for its release as a single.

Background
For its release as a single, the song was heavily remixed, with mixes from producers including Ralphi Rosario and Eddie Baez. All of the chart positions for the single are for each of the remixed versions of the song respectively. The single first peaked at No. 22 on the Billboard Hot Dance Club Play Chart in September 2005. After Bublé performed the album version of the song during the closing credits of the film The Wedding Date, this version was released to radio, peaking at No. 5 on the Billboard adult contemporary chart, as well as reaching No. 99 on the Billboard Hot 100. The music video for the track was once again directed by Noble Jones, who directed the videos for both of the album's previous singles – Home and Feeling Good. The music video was choreographed by Raymondo Chan, a Salsa Latin dance coach and performer. It was shot in Vancouver, Canada.

Track listing
 CD / DVD single
 "Save the Last Dance for Me" (album version) – 3:38
 "Save the Last Dance for Me" (Starcity remix) – 3:20
 "Save the Last Dance for Me" (live version – video) – 4:14
 "Save the Last Dance for Me" (music video) – 3:42

 Digital download
 "Save the Last Dance for Me" (album version) – 3:38
 "Save the Last Dance for Me" (Ralphi's Anthomic vocal) – 9:36
 "Save the Last Dance for Me" (Eddie's Anthem mix) – 9:53
 "Save the Last Dance for Me" (Ralphi's Hydrolic dub) – 8:29

Charts

Weekly charts

Year-end charts

Other versions
 In 1960, Dion recorded the song for inclusion on his album Alone With Dion.
 The String-A-Longs recorded a version at Norman Petty Studios in Clovis, NM, in 1960–61, released in the Philippines under Tiara Records (Tiara 001).
 Buck Owens released a cover version in 1962 that peaked at No. 11 on the US country charts and appeared on his albumTogether Again.
 Paul Anka recorded the song for his 1963 album Songs I Wish I'd Written.
 Jerry Lee Lewis recorded a version of the song with Sun Records on June 12, 1961, in Memphis, Tennessee at Sam Phillips' studio.  This version was released on his 1967 album Breathless, and as a single in 1978.
 The Swedish group the Spotnicks recorded an instrumental version of the song (they called "Valentina") for their 1964 album The Spotnicks in Spain.
 Cliff Richard included the song in his 1967 album Don't Stop Me Now!
 Billy Joe Royal released a version of the song on his 1967 album, Billy Joe Royal Featuring Hush.
 In 1969, The Beatles recorded a version of this song for their album Get Back (eventually called Let it Be) as part of a medley produced by Glyn Johns. The song  but was ultimately cut from the album, but in 2021 appeared in the 50th anniversary edition of the album. Footage of the group recording the song appears in the documentary The Beatles: Get Back.
 In 1969, British arranger and band leader Johnny Arthey arranged and conducted for John Rowles to record his 7" vinyl release on the MCA-UK label the following year.
 In 1974, Harry Nilsson included a version on his album Pussy Cats, arranged by Nilsson and John Lennon, produced by Lennon. Was released as a single in Germany, with a cover of Bob Dylan's "Subterranean Homesick Blues" as the B side. Also released as a single in the UK.
 The Walkmen did a cover of Pussy Cats which included "Save the Last Dance for Me". Also in 1974, Canadians the DeFranco Family reached No. 18 on the Billboard pop chart with their version of "Save the Last Dance for Me", with lead vocals sung by 14-year-young Tony DeFranco.
 In 1977, John Davidson reached No. 22 on the U.S. Adult Contemporary chart and No. 44 on the Canadian AC chart.
 In 1978, country music singer-songwriter Ron Shaw recorded the song on Pacific Challenger Records; this version reached the Top 40 on the Billboard country music chart.
 The Forgotten Rebels recorded the song on their 1981 album This Ain't Hollywood.
 In 1982 Mud featured the song in their album Mud Featuring Les Gray.
 In 1983 Herbie Armstrong included a haunting version of the song on his solo album 'Back against the wall'. 
 The song was translated into French by André Salvet and François Llenas and recorded by, among others, Petula Clark, Dalida, and Mort Shuman himself.
 Geno Delafose recorded the song as a zydeco version on the CD La Chanson Perdu in 1998 on Rounder Records.
 Bruce Willis released a version which appears on his 1989 album, If It Don't Kill You, It Just Makes You Stronger.
The Manhattan Transfer included a version on their 1995 album, Tonin'. As with most other tracks on the album, this recording featured a noted guest singer, this time Ben E. King, who sang principal lead on the original version by The Drifters.
 In 2000, Japanese band The Neatbeats recorded the song for their album Everybody Need!
On his 2000 album I Give My Heart to You, O.C. Smith recorded a version of the song.
 Irish singer Daniel O'Donnell recorded it on his 2003 album, Daniel in Blue Jeans.
 In the 2000s, UK musician and ex-band member of Fox, Herbie Armstrong, recorded a slower, minor version of the song and released it as a single from his album, Last Dance.
 In 2003, the Troggs recorded their version of this song on an album with re-recorded songs, called "Wild Thing".
 In 2004, Nancy Sinatra and Lee Hazlewood, and recorded the song for their album Nancy & Lee 3.
In 2008, Anne Murray included the song on her album An Intimate Evening with Anne Murray...Live.
 In 2011, Cheap Trick singer Robin Zander covered the song on his country album, Countryside Blvd.
 In 2012, American composer and producer Kramer covered the song and included it on his sixth album The Brill Building.

In popular culture
In 1960, American female R&B singer Damita Jo recorded an "answer record" to "Save the Last Dance for Me". Her song, entitled "I'll Save the Last Dance for You", built around the original song's melody and thus credited to Shuman and Pomus, peaked at No. 22 on the Billboard Hot 100 pop chart in December 1960.

See also
List of Hot 100 number-one singles of 1960 (U.S.)
List of number-one R&B singles of 1960 (U.S.)

References

External links
"Save the Last Dance for Me" - lyrics at Dolly Parton On-Line

1960 songs
1960 singles
1974 singles
1984 singles
2006 singles
Songs with lyrics by Doc Pomus
Songs with music by Mort Shuman
The Drifters songs
Buck Owens songs
Emmylou Harris songs
Dolly Parton songs
Michael Bublé songs
Billy Joe Royal songs
Jay and the Americans songs
The Beatles songs
Harry Nilsson songs
Petula Clark songs
The DeFranco Family songs
Billboard Hot 100 number-one singles
Cashbox number-one singles
Irish Singles Chart number-one singles
Number-one singles in New Zealand
Number-one singles in South Africa
Atlantic Records singles
RCA Records Nashville singles
Reprise Records singles
Songs about dancing
Ike & Tina Turner songs